All We Can Do may refer to:

"All We Can Do", song by Bill Frisell from Beautiful Dreamers (album) 
"All We Can Do", from Poo Bear Presents Bearthday Music